Dan Nimmer (born 1982) is an American jazz pianist and composer.

Early life
Nimmer was born in Milwaukee, Wisconsin, in 1982. He started playing the piano by ear. He had classical music lessons, and studied jazz at the Wisconsin Conservatory of Music from the age of 15. His parents also took him to hear local musicians perform, and he had the opportunity to play with them. While a student at Northern Illinois University, Nimmer continued playing in Chicago clubs.

Later life and career
Nimmer moved to New York in 2004. In the following year, he joined the Jazz at Lincoln Center Orchestra. He also became pianist in a variety of bands led by trumpeter Wynton Marsalis. Nimmer's second recording as leader was Kelly Blue, a tribute to pianist Wynton Kelly.

Playing style
A 2012 reviewer commented that "The emphasis on melody during the set is noteworthy, as Nimmer never let his considerable chops dominate a piece for the sake of show. Here is a pianist who respects the song". An earlier reviewer of Kelly Blue praised Nimmer's emulation of Kelly, and queried "whether Nimmer's technique and intimacy with history will eventually lead to the development of a distinctive personal voice".

Discography
An asterisk (*) indicates that the year is that of release.

As leader/co-leader

As sideman

References

1982 births
American jazz pianists
American male pianists
Living people
Musicians from Milwaukee
Northern Illinois University alumni
Wisconsin Conservatory of Music alumni
21st-century American pianists
21st-century American male musicians
American male jazz musicians
Jazz at Lincoln Center Orchestra members